USS Philippine Sea may refer to:

, was an aircraft carrier in service from 1946 to 1958
, is a guided missile cruiser commissioned in 1989 and in active service

United States Navy ship names